In control theory, robust control is an approach to controller design that explicitly deals with uncertainty. Robust control methods are designed to function properly provided that uncertain parameters or disturbances are found within some (typically compact) set. Robust methods aim to achieve robust performance and/or stability in the presence of bounded modelling errors.

The early methods of Bode and others were fairly robust; the state-space methods invented in the 1960s and 1970s were sometimes found to lack robustness, prompting research to improve them. This was the start of the theory of robust control, which took shape in the 1980s and 1990s and is still active today.

In contrast with an adaptive control policy, a robust control policy is static, rather than adapting to measurements of variations, the controller is designed to work assuming that certain variables will be unknown but
bounded.

Criteria for robustness
Informally, a controller designed for a particular set of parameters is said to be robust if it also works well under a different set of assumptions.  High-gain feedback is a simple example of a robust control method; with sufficiently high gain, the effect of any parameter variations will be negligible. From the closed-loop transfer function perspective, high open-loop gain leads to substantial disturbance rejection in the face of system parameter uncertainty. Other examples of robust control include sliding mode and terminal sliding mode control.

The major obstacle to achieving high loop gains is the need to maintain system closed-loop stability. Loop shaping which allows stable closed-loop operation can be a technical challenge.

Robust control systems often incorporate advanced topologies which include multiple feedback loops and feed-forward paths. The control laws may be represented by high order transfer functions required to simultaneously accomplish desired disturbance rejection performance with the robust closed-loop operation.

High-gain feedback is the principle that allows simplified models of operational amplifiers and emitter-degenerated bipolar transistors to be used in a variety of different settings. This idea was already well understood by Bode and Black in 1927.

The modern theory of robust control
The theory of robust control system began in the late 1970s and early 1980s and soon developed a number of techniques for dealing with bounded system uncertainty.

Probably the most important example of a robust control technique is H-infinity loop-shaping, which was developed by Duncan McFarlane and Keith Glover of Cambridge University; this method minimizes the sensitivity of a system over its frequency spectrum, and this guarantees that the system will not greatly deviate from expected trajectories when disturbances enter the system.

An emerging area of robust control from application point of view is sliding mode control (SMC), which is a variation of variable structure control (VSC). The robustness properties of SMC with respect to matched uncertainty as well as the simplicity in design attracted a variety of applications.

While robust control has been traditionally dealt with along deterministic approaches, in the last two decades this approach has been criticized on the basis that it is too rigid to describe real uncertainty, while it often also leads to over conservative solutions. Probabilistic robust control has been introduced as an alternative, see e.g. that interprets robust control within the so-called scenario optimization theory.

Another example is loop transfer recovery (LQG/LTR), which was developed to overcome the robustness problems of linear-quadratic-Gaussian control (LQG) control.

Other robust techniques includes quantitative feedback theory (QFT), passivity based control, Lyapunov based control, etc.

When system behavior varies considerably in normal operation, multiple control laws may have to be devised. Each distinct control law addresses a specific system behavior mode. An example is a computer hard disk drive. Separate robust control system modes are designed in order to address the rapid magnetic head traversal operation, known as the seek, a transitional settle operation as the magnetic head approaches its destination, and a track following mode during which the disk drive performs its data access operation.

One of the challenges is to design a control system that addresses these diverse system operating modes and enables smooth transition from one mode to the next as quickly as possible.

Such state machine-driven composite control system is an extension of the gain scheduling idea where the entire control strategy changes based upon changes in system behavior.

See also
 Control theory
 Control engineering
 Fractional-order control
 H-infinity control
 H-infinity loop-shaping
 Sliding mode control
 Intelligent control
 Process control
 Robust decision making
 Root locus
 Servomechanism
 Stable polynomial
 State space (controls)
 System identification
 Stability radius
 Iso-damping
 Active disturbance rejection control
 Quantitative feedback theory

References

Further reading

 
 
 
 
 
 
 
 

Control theory
Stochastic control